Protein CREG1 (Cellular Repressor of E1A-stimulated Genes 1) is a protein that in humans is encoded by the CREG1 gene.

The adenovirus E1A protein both activates and represses gene expression to promote cellular proliferation and inhibit differentiation. The protein encoded by this gene antagonizes transcriptional activation and cellular transformation by E1A. This protein shares limited sequence similarity with E1A and binds both the general transcription factor TBP and the tumor suppressor pRb in vitro. This gene may contribute to the transcriptional control of cell growth and differentiation.

References

External links

Further reading